Welcome to Carcass Cuntry is a country metal album by Jeffrey Walker, of the metal band Carcass. The instrumentation is performed by notable heavy metal musicians, including Faith No More's Billy Gould, H.I.M.'s Ville Valo, Anathema's Danny Cavanagh and Carcass members Bill Steer and Ken Owen. The album cover is by Larry Welz, the creator of Cherry.

Production 

The album was recorded between September 2004 and August 2005.

Music 

In an interview with Decibel magazine, Walker said "It's really not that original of an idea when you consider that Mike Ness has already done a country-hybrid album. But I don't think anyone from a background like mine has done it, and done it with a bit of respect — not turning it into a piss take."

Reception 

PopMatters complimented the album for being "fun".

Track listing

Personnel 

Niclas Etelävuori -	Engineer
Billy Gould	- Engineer
Mika Jussila	- Mastering
Santeri Kallio	- Engineer, Mixing
Tina Korhonen	- Photography
James Murphy	- Engineer
Jeffrey Walker - Mixing, Producer
Larry Welz - Artwork

References 

2006 debut albums
Jeffrey Walker albums
Country metal albums